The 2013 IIHF U18 World Championship Division III was a pair of international under-18 ice hockey tournaments organised by the International Ice Hockey Federation. The Division III A and Division III B tournaments represent the sixth and the seventh tier of the IIHF World U18 Championships.

Division III A
The Division III A tournament was played in Taipei City, Taiwan, from 11 to 16 March 2013.

Participants

Final standings

Results
All times are local. (National Standard Time – UTC+8)

Awards

Best Players Selected by the Directorate

Best Players of Each Team Selected by Coaches

Division III B
The Division III B tournament was played in İzmit, Turkey, from 7 to 10 February 2013.

Participants

Final standings

Results
All times are local. (Eastern European Time – UTC+2)

Awards

Best Players Selected by the Directorate

Best Players of Each Team Selected by Coaches

See also
 List of sporting events in Taiwan

References

III
2013
World
IIHF World U18 Championship Division III